Pireh Yusefian-e Sofla (also Romanized as Pīreh Yūsefīān-e Soflá) is a village in Yeylaq Rural District, in the Central District of Kaleybar County, East Azerbaijan Province, Iran. At the 2006 census, its population was 68, in 20 families.

References 

Populated places in Kaleybar County